The Metropolitan Correctional Center, New York (MCC New York) is a United States federal administrative detention facility in the Civic Center of Lower Manhattan, New York City, located on Park Row behind the Thurgood Marshall United States Courthouse at Foley Square. It is operated by the Federal Bureau of Prisons, a division of the United States Department of Justice.

MCC New York holds male and female prisoners of all security levels. Most prisoners held at MCC New York have pending cases in the United States District Court for the Southern District of New York. MCC New York also holds prisoners serving brief sentences.

The Los Angeles Times stated that the prison is often referred to as the "Guantanamo of New York", and The New York Times stated that its administrative segregation units had severe security measures.

History
Opened in 1975 in the Civic Center neighborhood of Lower Manhattan, MCC New York was the first high-rise facility to be used by the Bureau of Prisons. The jail was technically an extension of the Thurgood Marshall United States Courthouse, to which it was connected via a footbridge. Prisoners are assigned to one of 10 separate, self-contained housing units, resulting in little movement within the facility. In 2002, it was widely reported that MCC New York was severely overcrowded.

Numerous high-profile individuals have been held at MCC New York during court proceedings, including Gambino crime family bosses John Gotti and Jackie D'Amico, drug dealer Frank Lucas, Ponzi scheme fraudster Bernard Madoff, terrorists Omar Abdel Rahman and Ramzi Yousef, financier and sex offender Jeffrey Epstein, and weapons trafficker Viktor Bout. After being extradited to the United States, Mexican drug lord Joaquín "El Chapo" Guzmán was housed in the facility.

On August 26, 2021, the Federal Bureau of Prisons announced that the prison would be temporarily closed in response to deteriorating conditions. At the time of the announcement, 233 prisoners were held there; they were moved to other prisons while the department addresses the prison conditions.

Facility
The correctional center is housed in a 12-story high-rise building located at 150 Park Row in the Civic Center neighborhood. In 2017, it had 796 inmates, both male and female, which is far more than its design capacity of 449. The facility has one female wing; seven General Population male wings, six of which feature cells and one is a dorm; one Special Housing Unit (SHU); and one "supermax" unit. Each unit takes up two stories. All General Population units feature a gym (no weights), a kitchen (microwaves, hot water, ice), and five TV sets (one in the gym and four in the common area). Offices, classes, and computers are located on the unit's second floor.  The jail is chronically understaffed.

Inmates in the 10-South wing are locked inside single-man cells 23 hours a day that are continuously monitored by CCTV cameras and have lights on at all times. Prisoners are kept isolated: their cells are equipped with showers, and the only time they're taken outside their cells is for exercise in an indoor cage.  No outdoor recreation is permitted. Most 10-South prisoners are subject to special administrative measures, which severely restrict their communication with other prisoners and with the outside world.

The 9-South wing is a designated SHU. It houses inmates that violated prison rules; new arrivals that have not been medically cleared for General Population yet; and inmates in Protective Custody (PC). Both inmates in a cell are cuffed at the back through a food slot every time the cell door is to be opened. Inmates are escorted to the shower three times a week, always cuffed.  The wing has leaky plumbing that results in prisoners encountering pools of standing water and sewage, and it also has rodent and cockroach infestations.

Notable inmates (current and former)

See also 

 Federal Bureau of Prisons
 Incarceration in the United States
 List of U.S. federal prisons

References

External links

 MCC New York

Buildings of the United States government in New York (state)
New York
Prisons in New York City
Civic Center, Manhattan
Skyscrapers in Manhattan
Government buildings in Manhattan
1975 establishments in New York City